Ngô Thị Thanh Hằng (born 27 April 1960 in Nam Định Province) is a Vietnamese politician. She was a member of the 12th Central Committee of the Communist Party of Vietnam, Member of the Standing Committee of the Hanoi Party Committee, Deputy Secretary of the Hanoi Party Committee, Delegate of the Hanoi People's Council.

References 

Members of the 12th Central Committee of the Communist Party of Vietnam
1960 births
Living people
People from Nam Định province